Ryan Ginand (born April 1, 1986) is an American professional ice hockey player.

Career

College hockey 
Ginand attended Northeastern University from 2005 to 2009 where he played NCAA Division I college hockey with the Northeastern Huskies men's ice hockey team, scoring 46 goals and 36 assists in 132 games while earning NCAA All Star accolades.

Professional 
In November 2009, following a contract with Herning Blue Fox of the Danish Elite League, Ginand signed with the Trenton Devils of the ECHL.

On May 8, 2013, after playing in the New Jersey Devils and Minnesota Wild organizations, Ginand signed as a free agent in Italy for a one-year contract then with a British club, the Coventry Blaze of the EIHL, on a one-year contract.

Personal life
His younger brother, Phil Ginand, played 11 games with the Bridgeport Sound Tigers in the AHL during the 2010–11 season.

Awards and honors

References

External links

Living people
1986 births
Albany Devils players
Houston Aeros (1994–2013) players
Trenton Devils players
Orlando Solar Bears (ECHL) players
Northeastern Huskies men's ice hockey players
Gwinnett Gladiators players
Herning Blue Fox players
Coventry Blaze players
American men's ice hockey centers